Constituencies of Mauritius are the electoral boundaries within the Republic of Mauritius. They are also commonly referred to as Circonscriptions amongst the locals. The country follows the Westminster system and elects 60 members of parliament for a term of 5 years. There are in all 21 Constituencies in the republic, each of them returning 3 members with the exception of Constituency No 21, which returns only 2 members. The Constitution stipulates that there shall be 20 constituencies and one created specially for the Rodrigues island.

Those electoral boundaries are considered to be the main pillars for elections as they allow members of parliament to be elected and thus to form the government. As mentioned in the Constitution, the Electoral Boundaries Commission shall review the boundaries of the constituencies at such times as will enable them to present a report to the Assembly 10 years, as near as may be, after 12 August 1966 and, thereafter, 10 years after presentation of their last report.

Due to the ethnic diversity of Mauritius the country's political system ensures that all ethnic groups are fairly represented. The Constitution identifies 4 main ethnic groups which are the Indo-Mauritians, Muslims, General Population and Sino-Mauritians. General Population refers to the Creoles, Franco-Mauritians as well as Christians of South Indian (Tamil) origins.

History of Constituencies
Before 1967, according to the previous (pre-independence) Constitution, Mauritius was divided into 40 constituencies and one Member of Parliament (MP) was elected from each constituency. Elected MPs elected a Chief Minister as well as Council Members.

Today, the constituencies still remain more or less the same but, ever since the new Constitution provided in 1992, many of the previously smaller 40 constituencies have been reorganised so as to now form a total of 21 constituencies.

The results showed a directly members would be including 24 MPs of Hindu community, 3 MPs elected from the Muslims, 1 MP elected from the sino-Mauritians and the 12 resting MPs were of Christian group. This affected the equality of representation thought ethnic groups which are considered as very sensitive subject and then government decided to amend the law and move it to a system of Best Loser.

Best Loser System
The Best Loser System ensures representation of minority ethnic groups in the parliament. In addition to the 62 directly elected members, the Constitution provides for the allocation of 8 additional seats to the "Best Losers" who were candidates from specific minority ethnic groups, but had not been elected. Best Losers are usually from the Creole, Muslim and Sino-Mauritian groups. No Hindu of North Indian "Hindi-speaking" origins can secure a Best Loser seat although Hindus of Tamil, Telugu and Marathi origins  speakers have been elected through the system and it was done lastly in 2000.

The Best Loser System was set up long ago to prevent political and social tension in the country however as at January 2012, and after the Carcassonne Report, the need of electoral reform in Mauritius made headlines  and the probability of abolishing the Best Loser System has surfaced.

The Constituencies in 2019
Since the 1967 general elections the list of 21 Constituencies has not changed. The composition of each constituency at the 2019 elections is shown in the table below.

Constituency No. 1
The Constituency, namely Grand River North West and Port Louis West is mainly composed of Christianity majority. It comprises part of Pailles, Point Aux Sables, La Tour König, GRNW and west part of Port Louis. With 40,572 voters, it is one of the most underdeveloped areas of Port Louis. All of the vicinity fall in the boundaries of the Capital and thus form one of the 4 constituencies of Port Louis city. Since the 1976 elections it has been a bastion of the MMM. 

Notable members of parliament from the constituency were James Burty, former Minister of Rodrigues & Outer Islands and Anne Navarre Marie the former Minister of Women Rights. It is noted that the constituency is composed of the GRNW Prison and different rehabilitation centers as well as handicapped centers and various orphanage. It also contains the University of Technology, Mauritius situated at la Tour Koenig. The June 2010 mutiny at GRNW Prison within this constituency drew national attention due to the escape of 34 prisoners.

Constituency No. 2
Officially Port Louis South and Port Louis Central, this constituency has been a renowned area as it is composed of the central area of the city and also the south part comprising suburb areas like Cassis, The Victoria Bus Terminal, The North Bus terminal, the Port Louis Market, Le Champ de Mars and Mainly Vallée Pitot.  It is a Muslim majority area and has a total of 18,867 voters.

The constituency was mostly a bastion of the MMM from 1976 to 2005 until Rashid Beebeejaun switched his political allegiance from the MMM to the Mauritian Labour Party and the constituency became a bastion of the Labour Party.

Constituency No. 3

Also known as Port Louis Maritime and Port Louis East, the constituency no 3 is the smallest of the 20 having an electorate of only 17,186 of people. It has been carved just to satisfy ethnic representation. This was constructed out of the constituency no 2 just to implement the Muslim community which was not enough represented in parliament. This constituency was a bastion of the MMM since the 1970s. The governments led by Labour Party and MSM have neglected this constituency as none of their candidates was elected in No.3. The areas in this constituency are Plain Verte, Roche Bois, Terre Rouge, Batterie Cassée, Karo Kalyptis among others. The outer island of Agalega is also part of Constituency No. 3.

Constituency No. 4
Port Louis North and Montagne Longue constituency is the 4th and last electoral boundary of Port Louis City. The areas are among the most impoverished places in the country. It includes St Croix, Kailason, Creve Coeur ending in Montagne Longue. The constituency was among the constituencies left behind by the Jugnauth's government in the 80's as he had no Mps elected from there. It is a disputed constituency between the majority of Mauritian.

This constituency was a bastion of MMM since 1976 but is now disputed between the 3 main political parties, the MSM, MMM and the Mauritian Labour Party. It has recorded a total number of 46,179 voters in the 2010 elections.

Constituency No. 5

Pamplemousses and Triolet is the fifth constituency and one of the three main Hindu constituencies in the northern part of the country. It starts with the areas covering Pamplemousses, Triolet, Trou aux Biches ending near Mon Choisy. It is the second most populous constituency with 56,620 voters registered after Constituency no. 14. It is a constituency which has an overall majority of Hindus reaching nearly 80% of the voters.

It was the constituency of Seewoosagur Ramgoolam and Navin Ramgoolam.

Constituency No. 6

Grand Baie and Poudre d'Or is one of the three main Hindu constituency of Mauritius. The others being No 5 and No 7. Known to be a disputed electoral territory of the MSM and the Mauritius Labour Party, this constituency has a total of 48,379 registered electors.

The biggest centers of this Constituency is Grand Baie & Goodlands. Grand Baie, known to be the touristic center of the country has one of the foremost beautiful beaches, hotels and classic touristic boutiques. Goodlands is the most northern main residential and commercial town of this constituency. It is one of the pillars of the electoral area. Madan Dulloo who has been a member of the Labour Party, MSM and MMM was elected as Member of Parliament in 1983, 1987, 1991, 1995, 2000 and 2005. However, he lost the last general elections held in 2010 and thereafter.

Constituency No. 7

Piton and Riviere du Rempart is the seventh constituency and the last one of the three northern electoral boundaries of the Country. The constituency with an overall of Hindu majority has two important pillars which are, the commercial town, Riviere du Rempart and Piton. With 43,079 registered electors, this is a very historic constituency for being a bastion of the MSM since its formation.

The MSM founder Sir Anerood Jugnauth was a member of parliament for this constituency for nearly 50 years since his first election in 1963. Piton and Riviere du Rempart has been a bastion of the MSM since 1983.

Constituency No. 8

Quartier Militaire and Moka is an inland constituency with a registered number of 41,342 electors. With an absolute Hindu majority, this electoral boundary has important towns including Quartier Militaire, St Pierre and Moka with small adjacent villages including Camp Thorel, Solitude and Camp de Masque.

This constituency has had a member of the Jugnauth family as Member of Parliament since 1987. Ashock Jugnauth has been elected first member serving in 1987, 1991, 2000 and 2005. Pravind Jugnauth has been elected in 2009, 2010, 2014 and 2019.

Constituency No. 9

Flacq and Bon Accueil is the ninth constituency of the country. It is a coastal electoral boundary and is made up of the main town Flacq with some adjacent towns including Bon Accueil, Belle Mare and Lallmatie. It has registered number of 50,883 electors.

A constituency mainly of BLD. It was a bastion of politician Anil Bachoo who has been member of parliament serving since 1991. He has been elected in 2000, 2005 and lastly 2010. Other notable politicians previously elected in this constituency include Sangeet Fowdar and Satya Faugoo.

Constituency No. 10

Montagne Blanche and Grand River South East is the 10th constituency of the country and is a coastal electoral boundary.  Composed mostly of Hindus, it has a registered number of 47,296 electors.

For many years it was typically a Labour Party bastion. Former leader of the Labour Party, Sir Satcam Boolell was member of parliament serving more than 30 years in this constituency. It comprises Montagne Blanche, GRSE, Bel Air, Beau Champ and Trou d'Eau Douce.

Constituency No. 11

Vieux Grand Port and Rose Belle is the eleventh constituency and is a coastal constituency.

Constituency No. 12

Mahébourg and Plaine Magnien is the twelfth constituency. Its 36,242 voters are mostly Hindus.

Constituency No. 13

Rivière des Anguilles and Souillac is the thirteenth constituency. The electorate consists of 33,169 registered voters who belong to the Muslim, Hindu and Creole communities.

Constituency No. 14

Savanne and Black River is the fourteenth constituency. There are 58,341 voters in this constituency who are predominantly either Creoles or Hindus.

Constituency No. 15

La Caverne and Phoenix is the fifteenth constituency which is located inland. The bulk of its 53,548 voters belong to Muslim, Hindu or Creole ethnic groups.

Constituency No. 16

Vacoas and Floreal is the sixteenth constituency which is also inland. The predominant ethnic groups are Hindus and Creoles. A total of  44,053 voters are registered in this constituency.

Constituency No. 17

Curepipe and Midlands is the seventeenth constituency in which there are 45,346 registered voters. They belong to all the ethnic groups.

Constituency No. 18

The eighteenth constituency of Mauritius is Belle Rose and Quatre Bornes. A total of 42,173 voters are recorded there and they come from all ethnic groups.

Constituency No. 19

The nineteenth constituency is Stanley and Rose Hill with a total of 38,982 registered voters. All ethnic groups are represented in this constituency.

Constituency No. 20

Beau Bassin and Petite Rivière is the twentieth constituency. It has 42,656 registered voters who come from all ethnic groups.

Constituency No. 21

The outer island of Rodrigues is the twenty-first constituency where 26,930 voters are registered. They belong mostly to the Creole community. Gaëtan Duval enabled the inhabitants of Rodrigues to vote for the first time in August 1967 although the principle of universal suffrage was already in practice on mainland Mauritius since 1959. Prior to the 1967 elections Gaëtan Duval's PMSD lodged a civil action in the Supreme Court of Mauritius to contest Rodriguans' inability to vote at general elections. The Supreme Court ruled in Duval's favour.

References

Politics of Mauritius